Leer (Ostfriesland) is a railway station in the town of Leer in Lower Saxony, Germany. The railway station is situated on the Emsland Railway between the railway stations of Emden and Papenburg and it is the railway terminus on the Oldenburg–Leer railway after the railway station of Augustfehn. The train services are operated by Deutsche Bahn, WestfalenBahn and Arriva (a subsidiary of Deutsche Bahn).

Train services
The station is served by the following service(s):

Intercity services (IC/EC ) Norddeich - Emden - Münster - Düsseldorf - Köln - Bonn - Koblenz - Mainz - Mannheim - Stuttgart
Intercity services (IC ) Norddeich - Emden - Münster - Düsseldorf - Köln - Bonn - Koblenz - Mainz - Mannheim - Karlsruhe - Konstanz
Intercity services (IC ) Norddeich - Emden - Bremen - Hanover - Braunschweig - Magdeburg - Leipzig
Regional services  Norddeich - Emden - Leer - Oldenburg - Bremen - Nienburg - Hanover
Regional services  Emden - Leer - Lingen (Ems) - Rheine - Münster
Local services  Groningen – Winschoten – Bad Nieuweschans – Leer

The train service RB57 is replaced by buses since December 2015 for the foreseeable future due a damaged bridge over the Ems between Leer and Weener.

Bus services

460: Leer - Holtland - Hesel - Aurich
467: Leer - Bagband - Strackholt - Ostgroßefehn - Wiesmoor
479: Leer - Holtland - Hesel - Neukamperfehn - Jheringsfehn
481: Leer - Moormerland - Timmel - Aurich
600: Leer - Ihrhove - Flachsmeer - Papenburg
604: Leer - Bunde - Verlaat - Ditzum
620: Leer - Weener - Bunde - Bad Nieuweschans
621: Leer - Neermoor/Warsingsfehn - Oldersum - Emden
622: Leer - Ihrhove - Papenburg
623: Leer - Augustfehn
624: Leer - Weener - Bunderhee - Kanalpolder
625: Leer - Remels - Westerstede
635: Leer - Wymeer
651: Bingum - Leerort - Blinke - Stadtmitte Leer - Logaer Weg - Logabirum (Leer Town Service)
656: Burlage - Ostrhauderfehn - Backemoor - Leer
661: Moormerland - Leer - Aurich
662: Jheringsfehn - Warsingsfehn - Leer
690: Burlage - Westrhauderfehn - Collinghorst - Leer

References

External links 
 

Railway stations in Lower Saxony
Railway stations in Germany opened in 1856